The PTS is a Soviet tracked amphibious transport. PTS stands for Plavayushchij Transportyer - Sryednyj or medium amphibious transport vehicle. Its industrial index was Ob'yekt 65.

Introduced in 1965, it is large, with a substantial payload of 10 tons, two to four times the capacity of the BAV 485, and better cross-country performance, at the cost of somewhat higher purchase costs because it is tracked. The most common model is the improved PTS-M that is powered by a 350 hp diesel engine.

Description
The PTS has a boxy, open watertight hull, with six road wheels per side, front drive sprocket, rear idler sprocket, and no return rollers. Like the BAV 485, and unlike the DUKW, it has a rear loading ramp. The crew is seated at the front, leaving the rear of the vehicle open for a vehicle, which can be driven (or backed) in, rather than lifted over the side. To aid in facilitating this, the engine is under the floor. Propulsion in water is by means of twin propellers, in tunnels to protect them from damage during land operations.

The PTS-M also has a companion vehicle, the PKP, a boat-like amphibious two-wheeled trailer, with fold-out sponsons providing stability on water; the combination allows the PTS-M to accommodate an artillery tractor, field gun (up to medium caliber), its crew, and a quantity of ammunition, all in one load.

Specifications

Top speed:  (road)
Range:

Variants
PTS-2
PTS-3
PTS-4
In 2014, the Russian Defense Ministry intends to purchase an undetermined number of PTS-4s, which underwent acceptance trials in 2011. The vehicle will be fitted with a remotely operated  machine gun and a multi-fuel engine. The PTS-4 weighs 33 tons, with a payload of 12 tons on land (18 tons on water). Unlike its predecessors, it uses T-80 suspension components. The fully enclosed cab offers protection against small arms fire and splinter. Production began in 2014.

Users 

The PTS-M was adopted by the Soviet Army and Warsaw Pact forces, and has been supplied to Egypt, the former Yugoslavia, Iraq, Uruguay, and other nations.

 - PTS-M (used during operation Badr)

 (Indonesian Marine Corps)

  - 12 PTSM

 - 15 PTS-2
  Russian separatist forces in Donbass - PTS-2
 - 2 PTS in service

Former users 
  - 4 PTS-2
 
 
  - 51 PTS-2
 
  - 282 PTS-M retired
 
 - Passed on to successor states:

See also
GAZ-46
Landwasserschlepper

References

Notes

Sources
Hogg, Ian V., and Weeks, John.  The Illustrated Encyclopedia of Military Vehicles, p. 309, "PTS Tracked Amphibian". London: Hamblyn Publishing Group, 1980.

External links
Photos of the PTS-M on Prime Portal
Hungarian PTS-M walkarounds

Amphibious military vehicles
Military vehicles of the Soviet Union
Military bridging equipment
Tracked amphibious vehicles
Military vehicles introduced in the 1960s